Assheton St George Gorton (10 July 1930 – 14 September 2014) was an English production designer. He was educated at Sedbergh School. He was nominated for an Academy Award in the category Best Art Direction for the film The French Lieutenant's Woman and was the BAFTA nominated art director for Michelangelo Antonioni's 1966 film Blowup.

Gorton had lived in Church Stoke in Powys, Wales since 1976. He died there in his sleep on 14 September 2014; he was 84. He was the son of Neville Gorton, Bishop of Coventry from 1943 to 1952, formerly headmaster of Blundell's School.

Selected filmography
The Knack ...and How to Get It (1965)
Blow-Up (1966)
Wonderwall (1968)
The Bliss of Mrs. Blossom (1968)
The Bed-Sitting Room (1969)
The Magic Christian (1969)
Get Carter (1971)
Zachariah (1971)
The Pied Piper (1972)
The French Lieutenant's Woman (1981)
Legend (1985)
Revolution (1985)
Lost Angels (1989)
For the Boys (1991)
Rob Roy (1995)
101 Dalmatians (1996)
102 Dalmatians (2000)
Shadow of the Vampire (2000)

References

Interview in The Journal of British Film and Television, Vol. 4, No. 2, Edinburgh University Press, November 2007

External links
 
 Assheton Gorton Eithin Image Makers
 Assheton Gorton Interview with The British Entertainment History Project

1930 births
2014 deaths
British film designers
People educated at Sedbergh School
Masters of the Art Worker's Guild